Castello normanno (Italian for Norman castle)  is a  Middle Ages-18th century castle in Anversa degli Abruzzi, Province of L'Aquila Abruzzo, central-southern Italy.

History 
The castle was built by  Antonio di Sangro in 15th century on the ruins of a preexisting tower of 12th-13th century.

Now it is a private property and it has been used by Gabriele D'Annunzio as location for his tragedy La fiaccola sotto il moggio.

Architecture 
The castle main body is a parallelepiped built in stone, with the ruins of a tower on a side.

The main body hosts the Chapel of St Michael the Archangel.

References

External links
 

Norman (Anversa degli Abruzzi)
Anversa degli Abruzzi